Halls Creek is a stream in Garfield and Kane counties, in Utah, United States.

Halls Creek was named for Charles Hall, a pioneer who settled at the creek in the 1880s.

See also
List of rivers of Utah

References

Rivers of Garfield County, Utah
Rivers of Kane County, Utah
Rivers of Utah